Kenneth Leland Nash (July 14, 1888 - February 16, 1977) was a Major League Baseball infielder who played for two seasons. He played 11 games for the Cleveland Naps in 1912 and 24 games for the St. Louis Cardinals in 1914. He split time as a shortstop, third baseman, and second baseman. He attended Brown University and played in one game in 1912 under the name of "Costello."

Nash served in the Massachusetts House of Representatives from 1914 to 1916 and in the Massachusetts Senate from 1917 to 1918.

References

External links

1888 births
1977 deaths
Major League Baseball infielders
Cleveland Naps players
St. Louis Cardinals players
Waterbury Contenders players
Montreal Royals players
St. Paul Saints (AA) players
Members of the Massachusetts House of Representatives
Massachusetts state senators
American expatriate baseball players in Canada
Tufts Jumbos baseball coaches
Brown Bears baseball players
Massachusetts state court judges